Egnasia participalis is a moth of the family Noctuidae first described by Francis Walker in 1891. It is found in India and Sri Lanka. It has a 28 mm wingspan, a yellow-colored body and a forewing with the lunulate hyaline (glass-like) mark at the end of the cell. The outer lines of both wings are slightly sinuous. In the hindwing, the outer line rises from near the apex.

References

Moths of Asia
Moths described in 1891